The second series of the British reality-documentary series The Big Reunion began airing on ITV2 on 6 February 2014 and ended on 27 March 2014. The show features 'teen' bands, some of whom were big names in the UK pop music scene between the 1990s and early 2000s, and the programme follows them as they reunite for the first time in a decade and go through their two weeks of intensive rehearsals before finally stepping back on stage for a comeback performance.

The bands who reunited for the second series were 3T, A1, Damage, Eternal and Girl Thing. Additionally, Kenzie from Blazin' Squad, Dane Bowers from Another Level, and former soloists Adam Rickitt, Kavana and Gareth Gates, joined together to form the supergroup 5th Story.

Background
Due to the massive success of the first series of The Big Reunion, which saw the reunions of Five, 911, Atomic Kitten, B*Witched, Blue, Honeyz and Liberty X, it was widely reported that a second series would be commissioned. Groups were rumoured to be reuniting for series 2 included Big Brovaz, Hear'Say, S Club 7, Busted, Mis-Teeq, East 17, All Saints, Eternal, A1, Cleopatra and Another Level. S Club 7 were reportedly in talks to reform for their own rival show to The Big Reunion. In regards to Hear'Say reuniting, Myleene Klass said, "I just can't imagine it. What are we going to do - sing 'Pure and Simple' on loop? It was nice and it was a great time in our lives, and where it was at that time is just perfect." It was also reported that Eternal could reform without Louise Redknapp, who initially walked away from the group in 1995.

On 27 December 2013, ITV announced that the six bands taking part in the show's second series would be A1, Eternal, Damage, 3T, Girl Thing and a supergroup called 5th Story, which consists of Gareth Gates, Another Level's Dane Bowers, Adam Rickitt, Kavana and Blazin' Squad's Kenzie. As previously reported, Eternal reunited for the show as a three-piece as Redknapp chose not to take part in their reunion. Additionally, Damage's Coreé Richards and A1's Paul Marazzi chose not to take part either, although Richards did appear on the show to talk about the band. Richards chose not to take part due to conflicts with the band.

Another Level were on the verge of signing up for the show, but Bowers' ex-bandmate Wayne Williams has since announced that he will not take part. In an interview with MTV UK, he said: "I decided not to participate in The Big Reunion because it wouldn't feel right to me...I'm in a totally different space in my life and I don't feel any need to look back."

On 26 January 2014, it was announced that series 2 would begin airing on ITV2 on 6 February 2014. The bands' comeback gig at the Hammersmith Apollo took place on 21 February 2014.

Bands
 3T
 A1 (without Paul Marazzi)
 Damage (without Coreé Richards)
 Eternal (without Louise Redknapp)
 Girl Thing
 5th Story (supergroup consisting of Kenzie from Blazin' Squad, Dane Bowers from Another Level, Adam Rickitt, Kavana and Gareth Gates)

Episodes

{| class="wikitable plainrowheaders" style="width: 100%; margin-right: 0;"
|- style="color:black"
! style="background:#FF6A5A;"| No.
! style="background:#FF6A5A;"| Title
! style="background:#FF6A5A;"| Featured band(s)
! style="background:#FF6A5A;"| Original air date
! style="background:#FF6A5A;"| UK viewers

|}

Reception

Ratings
The first episode of the series was seen by an audience of 463,000, less than half the audience of the series 1 premiere. The second episode fell even further, bringing in 324,000 viewers.

Critical reception
Reviewing the first episode, Digital Spy's Catriona Wightman wrote, "if this first episode proved anything, it's that The Big Reunion is not about the music. It never has been, really - our obsession with Abz was really down to his hats, farming and tough post-fame life. And with Girl Thing, their story of the hype, the arguments and the crashing fall was an interesting enough insight into the world of the music business that we stopped caring about the fact that they never made it big. Honestly, that was kind of the point." In a negative review, the Daily Mirrors Kevin O'Sullivan said, ""This rigidly formulaic show is simply repeating itself. But take it away hopeless narrator Andi Peters: They scaled the icy unforgiving edifice of the artistic mountain we call pop..." Who writes this crap?'

References

External links
Official website

2014 British television seasons
British music television shows